Sergio McClain (born November 2, 1978) is a former professional basketball player and NJCAA coach.  He was the 1997 winner of the Illinois Mr. Basketball award.

High school career
McClain attended Peoria Manual High School, and helped lead his basketball team to a record four consecutive state titles. He was a three time all-state selection, Conference Player of the Year in 1997, and was named 1997 Illinois Mr. Basketball. McClain was the only high school basketball player in Illinois state history to start on four straight state championship teams until Jabari Parker helped lead Simeon Career Academy in Chicago to four straight state titles.

College career
McClain later played for Lon Kruger and Bill Self at the University of Illinois, along with his high school teammates Marcus Griffin and Frank Williams.  "The Peoria 3" anchored one of the Big Ten's top teams during their time there and the Illini ultimately earned a number one seed in the 2001 NCAA Tournament, advancing to the Elite 8.  His intimidating stature led Illini football coach Ron Turner to approach him about trying out for his team as a linebacker or safety, but after a few practices, McClain decided to focus on basketball.

Coaching career
McClain was head for the now defunct Peoria Kings ABA franchise from 2006–2007. He later served as head coach at the NJCAA Division II level for Parkland College in Champaign, Illinois from 2008–2009. In his only season with Parkland, McClain went 14–15 with a seven-man roster. McClain returned to coaching in 2013, acting as head coach for the Springfield Express of the Independent Basketball Association. From 2013–2016 McClain coached at Champaign Central High School and at Dade Christian School until accepting the head coach position for the Champaign Swarm.

References

External links
College statistics
RealGM profile

1978 births
Living people
African-American basketball players
Asheville Altitude players
Basketball coaches from Illinois
Basketball players from Illinois
High school basketball coaches in the United States
Illinois Fighting Illini men's basketball players
Sportspeople from Peoria, Illinois
American men's basketball players
Small forwards
Shooting guards